Winifred Hamrick Farrar (5 March 1923 – 6 November 2010) was the Poet Laureate of Mississippi from 1978 to 2010.

She was born on a family farm near Collinsville. She graduated from the University of Mississippi in 1945, married Robert H. Farrar, and taught English for thirty years in public schools in Meridian. She earned a Master's degree from the University of Southern Mississippi in 1962.

She was appointed Poet Laureate on 31 July 1978 by Governor Cliff Finch.

Works
Moral intention in the work of William Faulkner: a call for positive action (1962)
Cry Life (1968)
The Seeking Spirit (1974)
Behind the Ridge (1987)

References

Bibliography
Dorothy Abbott, ed. Mississippi Writers: Reflections of Childhood and Youth. Volume 3 of Mississippi Writers. Center for the Study of Southern Culture Series. University Press of Mississippi, 1988. Page 392.

1923 births
2010 deaths
Writers from Mississippi
Poets Laureate of Mississippi
20th-century American poets
People from Collinsville, Mississippi